In the Days of McKinley is a book by Margaret Leech published in 1959 by Harper & Brothers Publishers which won the 1960 Pulitzer Prize for History. It is a biography of the former American President William McKinley.

References 

1959 non-fiction books
Pulitzer Prize for History-winning works
Books about William McKinley